This article provides details of international football games played by the Israel national football team from 2020 to present.

Results

2020

2021

2022

Forthcoming fixtures
The following matches are scheduled:

See also
Israel national football team results (1990–2019)
Israel national football team results (1960–1989)
Israel national football team results (1934–1959)

Notes

References

External links

Football in Israel
2020
2020s in Israeli sport